Jon Harris (born 11 July 1967) is a British film editor known for his work on Snatch (2000), Layer Cake (2004), The Descent (2005), Stardust (2007), 127 Hours (2010), The Woman in Black (2012), The Two Faces of January (2014), T2 Trainspotting (2017), McMafia (2018), Yesterday (2019) and The Dig (2021). 

He was nominated for an Academy Award for Best Film Editing for 127 Hours.

Career

Harris received a British Independent Film Award (BIFA) for Best Technical Achievement 2005 for his work on Neil Marshall's The Descent (2005).

In 2011 Harris was nominated for an Academy Award (Oscar) and a British Academy of Film and Television Arts (BAFTA) Award for his editing work on Danny Boyle's 127 Hours (2010) and subsequently became a member of the American Academy of Motion Picture Arts and Sciences (AMPAS). He has a further 13 nominations including a Saturn Award Best Editing nomination for his editing work on Kingsman: The Secret Service (2015) alongside Eddie Hamilton.

Harris is currently working on a six-part TV series entitled Pistol that charts the rise and fall of the Sex Pistols, based on Steve Jones' autobiography Lonely Boy. The series is directed by Danny Boyle and is set to air on FX (TV channel) in 2022.

Filmography

Editor
The Dig (2021)
 Yesterday (2019)
 Darkness Visible (2019)
 Tell It to the Bees (2018)
 McMafia (2018)
 T2 Trainspotting (2017)
 Bastille Day (2016)
 Kingsman: The Secret Service (2014)
 The Two Faces of January (2014)
 Christmas in a Day (2013)
 Trance (2013)
 The Woman in Black (2012)
 127 Hours (2010)
 Kick-Ass (2010)
 The Descent Part 2 (2009)
 Eden Lake (2008)
 Stardust (2007)
 Starter for 10 (2006)
 Being Cyrus (2005)
 The Descent (2005)
 Layer Cake (2004)
 The Calcium Kid (2004)
 dot the i (2003)
 Ripley's Game (2002)
 Snatch (2000)

Director
 The Descent Part 2 (2009)

Additional editor
 Unlocked (2017)
 Swallows and Amazons (2016)
 Paddington (2014)

Assistant editor
 The Secret Agent (1996)
 When Saturday Comes (1996)
 The Turnaround (1995)

Assistant director
 Solitaire for 2 (1995)

Supervising editor 
 Access All Areas (2017)

Executive producer 
 Filth (2013)

Associate Producer 
 On the Count of Three (2021)

References

External links

1967 births
Living people
British film editors
British film directors
Film people from Sheffield